Wu Yanan (born April 18, 1996) is a Chinese mixed martial artist is a Bantamweight division. A professional competitor since 2013, she formerly competed for the Ultimate Fighting Championship, Chinese Kung Fu Championships, and WLF W.A.R.S.

Background
Wu began training Sanda in middle school, eventually competing in the national level in the discipline. She graduated from Xi'an Physical Education University, where she majored in Sanda under the tuterlage of Zhao Xuejun.

Mixed martial arts career

Early career
Wu made her pro debut in 2013 under the banner of Fighting China, facing fellow debutante  Joo Young Lee. Yanan won the bout by a first round TKO.

Wu's first appearance with the Chinese Kung Fu Championships came almost a year after her first fight, at CKF 9/21. She faced Bo Meng who was coming off of a win against Zhang Weili. Yanan won the fight by a unanimous decision. Six months later she faced Yang Liu, who was making her pro debut. Yanan won through a first round TKO. Wu's next fight was a rematch against Bo Meng at CKF 7/7, which Wu won by a split decision. At CKF 4: Day 1 Yanan faced another debutante in Jinghuan Zhu, which she won by a first round submission. It was her first and only fight at featherweight At WLF E.P.I.C. 5 Wu fought against Bayarmaa Munkhgerel, who hadn't yet won a pro fight, and won through a second round TKO. She returned to CKF to face Saeedeh Fardsanei who was making her debut, and won by a first round TKO.

Leaving the Chinese Kung Fu Championships, Wu fought against the 8-2 Yana Kunitskaya under the banner of Fightspirit Championship at Fightspirit Championship 6. She suffered the first professional loss of her career, with Kunitskaya stopping her by way of TKO, after only 32 seconds of the second round. Fighting at Kunlun Fight MMA 7, Yanan faced the 0-3 Anjela Pink winning in the first round through a TKO. At WLF W.A.R.S. 12 Wu faced the debuting Zuriana Makoeva, stopping her through a TKO in the fourth minute of the second round.

Ultimate Fighting Championship
Wu made her UFC debut on November 25, 2017, at UFC Fight Night 122 against Gina Mazany. She lost the fight via unanimous decision.

Wu faced Lauren Mueller on November 24, 2018, at UFC Fight Night 141. She won the fight via first round armbar.

Wu was scheduled to fight Luana Carolina on May 11, 2019, at UFC 237, but was forced to pull out due to an injury. The fight was rescheduled for UFC Fight Night 157 on August 31, 2019, however Carolina pulled out of the fight due to a fractured spine. Wu instead faced former DEEP Jewels champion Mizuki Inoue. At the weigh-ins, Wu weighed in at 129 pounds, three pounds over the flyweight non-title fight limit, and forfeited 30% of her purse to Inoue. Wu lost the fight via split decision.

Wu was scheduled to face Bethe Correia on December 5, 2020, at UFC on ESPN 19 However, due to visa issues, they were rescheduled for UFC on ABC 1 on January 16, 2021. In early January 2021, it was reported that Corria was forced to withdraw from the bout due to undergoing surgery to remove her appendix.  On January 7, it was announced that Wu would face UFC newcomer Joselyne Edwards. She lost the fight via unanimous decision.

Wu was scheduled to face Nicco Montaño on July 31, 2021, at UFC on ESPN 28. However, the fight was canceled after Montaño missed weight by seven pounds at the weigh-ins.

Wu was scheduled to face Josiane Nunes on February 26, 2022, at UFC Fight Night 202. However, Wu was pulled from the bout for undisclosed reasons and was replaced by promotional newcomer Jennifer Gonzalez.

Wu faced Mayra Bueno Silva on April 16, 2022, at UFC on ESPN 34. She lost the fight via unanimous decision. This fight earned her the Fight of the Night award.

Wu faced returning veteran Lucie Pudilová on August 20, 2022, at UFC 278. She lost the bout via TKO stoppage in the second round due to elbows on the ground.

In August 2022, it was announced that Wu was no longer on the UFC roster.

Championships and accomplishments
Ultimate Fighting Championship
Fight of the Night (One time)

Mixed martial arts record
 

|-
|Loss
|align=center|13–6
|Lucie Pudilová
|TKO (elbows)
|UFC 278
|
|align=center|2
|align=center|4:04
|Salt Lake City, Utah, United States
|
|-
|Loss
|align=center|13–5
|Mayra Bueno Silva
|Decision (unanimous)
|UFC on ESPN: Luque vs. Muhammad 2
|
|align=center|3
|align=center|5:00
|Las Vegas, Nevada, United States
|
|-
|Loss
|align=center|13–4
|Joselyne Edwards
|Decision (unanimous)
|UFC on ABC: Holloway vs. Kattar
|
|align=center|3
|align=center|5:00
|Abu Dhabi, United Arab Emirates
|
|-
|Loss
|align=center|13–3
|Mizuki Inoue
|Decision (split)
|UFC Fight Night: Andrade vs. Zhang
|
|align=center|3
|align=center|5:00
|Shenzhen, China
|
|-
|Win
|align=center|13–2
|Lauren Mueller
|Submission (armbar)
|UFC Fight Night: Blaydes vs. Ngannou 2
|
|align=center|1
|align=center|4:00
|Beijing, China
|
|-
|Loss
|align=center|12–2
|Gina Mazany
|Decision (unanimous)
|UFC Fight Night: Bisping vs. Gastelum
|
|align=center|3
|align=center|5:00
|Shanghai, China
|
|-
|Win
|align=center|12–1
|Zuriana Makoeva
|TKO (punches)
|WLF W.A.R.S. 12
|
|align=center|2
|align=center|3:19
|Zhengzhou, China
|
|-
|Win
|align=center|11–1
|Margarita Naschyokina
|Submission (armbar)
|Chin Woo Men: 2016-2017 Season, Stage 4
|
|align=center|1
|align=center|0:33
|Hefei, China
|
|-
|Win
|align=center|10–1
|Alena Kuchynskaya
|TKO (punches)
|Chin Woo Men: 2016-2017 Season, Stage 1
|
|align=center|2
|align=center|2:13
|Beijing, China
|
|-
|Win
|align=center|9–1
|Anjela Pink
|TKO (punches)
|Kunlun Fight MMA 7
|
|align=center|1
|align=center|1:17
|Beijing, China
|
|-
|Loss
|align=center|8–1
|Yana Kunitskaya
|TKO (punches)
|Fightspirit Championship 6
|
|align=center|2
|align=center|0:32
|Saint Petersburg, Russia
|
|-
|Win
|align=center|8–0
|Saeedeh Fardsanei
|TKO (submission to punches)
|Chinese Kung Fu Championships: Sunkin
|
|align=center|1
|align=center|1:22
|Qingdao, China
|
|-
|Win
|align=center|7–0
|Bayarmaa Munkhgerel
|Technical Submission (armbar)
|WLF E.P.I.C.: Elevation Power in Cage 5
|
|align=center|2
|align=center|3:43
|Zhengzhou, China
|
|-
|Win
|align=center|6–0
|Kristina Derecha
|Submission (armbar)
|CKF: China vs. Russia
|
|align=center|1
|align=center|3:41
|Beijing, China
|
|-
|Win
|align=center|5–0
|Jinghuan Zhu
|Submission (armbar)
|CKFC 4
|
|align=center|1
|align=center|1:22
|Qingyang, China
|
|-
|Win
|align=center|4–0
|Yang Liu
|TKO (submission to punches)
|CKFC 3/13
|
|align=center|1
|align=center|0:48
|Qingyang, China
|
|-
|Win
|align=center|3–0
|Debbie Tucker
|Decision (unanimous)
|Fight King Gold Belt Contest
|
|align=center|2
|align=center|5:00
|Xi'an, China
|
|-
|Win
|align=center|2–0
|Meng Bo
|Decision (unanimous)
|CKFC 9/21
|
|align=center|5
|align=center|3:00
|Qingyang, China
|
|-
|Win
|align=center|1–0
|Young Joon Lee
|TKO (punches)
|Fighting China
|
|align=center|1
|align=center|N/A
|Qingyang, China
|
|-
|}

See also
List of female mixed martial artists

References

External links
 
 

1996 births
Living people
Chinese female mixed martial artists
Bantamweight mixed martial artists
W
Mixed martial artists utilizing Brazilian jiu-jitsu
Kunlun Fight MMA Fighters
Ultimate Fighting Championship female fighters
Flyweight mixed martial artists
Sportspeople from Liaoning
People from Chaoyang, Liaoning